Jordan Horowitz (born April 10, 1980) is an American film producer. He is best known for producing the musical romantic-drama film La La Land that earned numerous awards and nominations including a nomination for the Academy Award for Best Picture with producers Marc Platt and Fred Berger.

Early life and education
Horowitz was raised in Westchester County, New York. He is of Jewish descent. In 2002, he graduated from Northwestern University in Evanston, Illinois.

Academy Awards incident 
At the 89th Academy Awards, presenters Faye Dunaway and Warren Beatty announced that La La Land was the winner of Best Picture. However, they had mistakenly been given the envelope for Best Actress, a category in which Emma Stone had won for her role in La La Land several minutes prior. When the mistake was realized, Horowitz rushed to the microphone to announce Moonlight as the correct winner, taking the card from Warren Beatty to show to the audience and then presented the Oscar to the winning producers. This occurred after PricewaterhouseCoopers representatives appeared on stage to discuss the mistake with the team from La La Land and Warren Beatty.

Personal life
Horowitz is married to Julia Hart, who is a Hollywood writer and director, known for The Keeping Room (2014), Miss Stevens (2016) and Fast Color (2018). They have two children together.

Filmography
Producer
 2010: The Kids Are All Right 
 2010: Meet Monica Velour
 2012: Save the Date
 2013: Are You Here 
 2014: The Keeping Room
 2016: Miss Stevens
 2016: The Cleanse 
 2016: Little Boxes
 2016: La La Land 
 2018: Fast Color (Also co-writer) 
 2020: Stargirl (Also co-writer)
 2020: I'm Your Woman (Also co-writer)
 2022: Hollywood Stargirl (Also co-writer)

Executive producer
 2012: The Garden of Eden
 2018: Counterpart

See also

References

External links
 
Jordan Horowitz on Letterboxd

1980 births
Living people
American film producers
20th-century American Jews
Filmmakers who won the Best Film BAFTA Award
Golden Globe Award-winning producers
21st-century American Jews